860 Ursina is a minor planet orbiting the Sun that was discovered in 1917 by German astronomer Max Wolf. The origin of the name is unknown.

Photometric observations of this asteroid collected during 1999 show a rotation period of 9.386 ± 0.002 hours with a brightness variation of 0.22 magnitude.

References

External links 
 Lightcurve plot of 860 Ursina, Palmer Divide Observatory, B. D. Warner (1999)
 Asteroid Lightcurve Database (LCDB), query form (info )
 Dictionary of Minor Planet Names, Google books
 Asteroids and comets rotation curves, CdR – Observatoire de Genève, Raoul Behrend
 Discovery Circumstances: Numbered Minor Planets (1)-(5000) – Minor Planet Center
 
 

000860
Discoveries by Max Wolf
Named minor planets
000860
000860
19170122